Kameel-rivier B or Kameelrivier is a village in the low-veld region of KwaNdebele, in the Nkangala District Municipality of the Mpumalanga province of South Africa where the majority of the residents are from the Ndebele people and Sepedi speaking people, predominantly in Mzimdala. Kameelrivier has two primary schools (Sizani Primary School and Sakhe Primary School) and three secondary schools (Tholulwazi Senior Secondary School, Hlanganani Senior School and Fundukhuphuke Middle School). There is also Morwe Middle school named after the native name of the village

References

Populated places in the Dr JS Moroka Local Municipality